Haroon Bacha (Pashto: هارون باچا ) (born July 27, 1972) is a Pashtun singer, musician, and composer who, since beginning his musical career in 1992, has released upwards of 50 albums and numerous singles.

Early life 
Haroon Bacha was born on July 27, 1972, in Panjpir, Swabi, Pakistan. He received his early education at Govt. High School Panjpir and followed with his matriculation from Govt. High School No. 1 Peshawar. Bacha completed his F.Sc. and B.A. from Edwardes College in 1992, and his master's degree in Social Work from the Department of Social Work at University of Peshawar.

Bacha had a natural flair for singing, taking part in Naat Qirat and singing competitions throughout his early school days. Govt. High School No. 1 provided some chances for young Haroon Bacha to exhibit his hidden talent, but it was the music club of Edwardes College that garnered him a real place in the world of Pashto music.

Career 
Haroon Bacha's musical career began in 1992 with a live television performance in Peshawar, Pakistan. His first album, "Da Rangoono Makhaam", was released in 1996, with "Ghwanchakoona" being released shortly thereafter. It was "Ghwanchakoona" that featured Bacha's most influential song to date, "Awal Ba Kala Kala Gham Wo". The song comprises of Pashto tappa poems, and has since been translated into Urdu, Farsi, Arabic, and English by numerous artists.

Since "Ghwanchakoona", Bacha has released more than 48 other albums along with singles like "Stergey Ghazal", "May Wey Nen Ba Haal", and "Deedan (Tapey)". Some of his recent albums include "Gulrang", "Heele", "Ulas Janaan Krra", and "Darman".

Bacha's musical career came to a crossroads in 2007 when he began receiving threats from the Pakistani Taliban. Through repeated text messages and phone calls, the Taliban asked him to quit music upon threat of death for him and his family. These threats lasted approximately one year until Bacha fled his home for Brooklyn, New York, where he was granted political asylum.

In 2009, Bacha became Radio Free Europe / Radio Liberty's Mashaal Radio branch's first employee as a broadcaster. In 2012, RFE/RL relocated him to work from their headquarters in Prague, Czechia.

References

1972 births
Living people
20th-century singers
21st-century singers
20th-century musicians
21st-century musicians
20th-century composers
21st-century composers
20th-century male singers
21st-century male singers
20th-century male musicians
21st-century male musicians
20th-century Afghan singers
21st-century Afghan singers
People from Swabi District
People from Peshawar
People from Khyber Pakhtunkhwa
Edwardes College alumni
University of Peshawar alumni
Radio Free Europe/Radio Liberty